Braak may refer to:

People
 Daniel ter Braak (born 1991), Dutch cricket player
 Eva Braak
 Heiko Braak (born 1937), German anatomist
  (1906-1991), German author
 Jan Willem Ter Braak (1914–1941), Dutch spy
 Menno ter Braak (1902–1940), Dutch author and journalist
  (born 1938), German politician
 Ross ter Braak (born 1997), New Zealand cricket player

Places
 Braak, Schleswig-Holstein, Germany

Ships
 HMS Braak, later name of Dutch ship Minerva (1787)
 HMS Braak (1795), 18-gun brig-sloop of the Royal Navy

Other
 Braak staging, used to classify the degree of Parkinson's disease and Alzheimer's disease